WHLF is an Adult Contemporary formatted broadcast radio station licensed to South Boston, Virginia, serving South Boston and Halifax County, Virginia.  WHLF is owned by Birch Broadcasting Corporation, through licensee Lakes Media, LLC.

References

External links
 95.3 HLF Online
 

1992 establishments in Virginia
Mainstream adult contemporary radio stations in the United States
Radio stations established in 1992
HLF